The 1987 Richmond Spiders football team was an American football team that represented the University of Richmond as a member of the Yankee Conference during the 1987 NCAA Division I-AA football season. In their eighth season under head coach Dal Shealy, Richmond compiled a 7–5 record, with a mark of 6–1 in conference play, finishing as Yankee co-champions. In the I-AA playoffs, the Spiders were defeated by Appalachian State in the first round.

Schedule

References

Richmond
Richmond Spiders football seasons
Yankee Conference football champion seasons
Richmond Spiders